Utmanzai may refer to:

Utmanzai (Sarbani tribe), a Sarbani Pashtun tribe
Utmanzai (Wazir clan)
 Utmanzai, Charsadda, a settlement in Charsadda District, Khyber Pakhtunkhwa, Pakistan